Eivind Vorren Karlsbakk, born 4 May 1975, is a retired footballer from Stryn in Norway. He is most known for his time years in Brann, but has also played for several other Norwegian clubs.

In the 1995 Norwegian Football Cup final, Karlsbakk was sent off by the referee Jon E. Skjervold. After reviewing the video replay the referee changed his report and Karlsbakk were allowed to play the re-match the following week.

References

1975 births
Living people
People from Stryn
Association football forwards
Norwegian footballers
Norway youth international footballers
SK Brann players
Sogndal Fotball players
Bryne FK players
Åsane Fotball players
Mandalskameratene players
Eliteserien players
Norwegian First Division players
Sportspeople from Vestland